A number of ships have been named Euryale, after the Gorgon of that name, including:

French ships
, a brig in service 1814−46
, a Génie-class brig

US ships
, a Euryale-class submarine tender

Ship names